Greengard is a surname. Notable people with the surname include:

 Irene Greengard (1924–2013), American actress and writer under the name Chris Chase
 Leslie Greengard (born 1957), American mathematician
 Michael "Mig" Greengard (born 1969), American chess author and journalist
 Paul Greengard (1925–2019), American molecular neuroscientist, shared the 2000 Nobel Prize for Physiology or Medicine

See also
 Pearl Meister Greengard Prize

English-language surnames